Uh-Huh is a 1983 album by John Cougar Mellencamp, a stage name for John Mellencamp and a transition from his early work under the name John Cougar. It was Mellencamp's seventh studio album and the first in which he used his real last name. It charted at #9 on the Billboard 200.

Uh-Huh contained three Top 20 Billboard Hot 100 hits: "Crumblin' Down" (#9), "Pink Houses" (#8), and  "Authority Song" (#15). In 1989, it was ranked No. 32 on Rolling Stone magazine's list of the 100 Greatest Albums of the 80's.

The remastered version was released March 29, 2005 on Mercury/Island/UMe and includes one bonus track.

Songwriting collaborations
Mellencamp almost always writes all of his own material. However, Uh-Huh saw him engage in one-time collaborations with two distinctly different songwriters: the legendary John Prine on "Jackie O", and the unknown Will Cary on "Lovin' Mother Fo Ya".

Of "Jackie O", Mellencamp said on The Bob & Tom Show in November 2004: "I can't take credit – John Prine wrote most of that song."

Mellencamp had written "Lovin' Mother Fo Ya" and was playing it live on his 1982 American Fool tour before it was even recorded (and before Cary had anything to do with the song). According to a 2003 article on LouisvilleMusic.com, Cary sent Mellencamp's guitarist Mike Wanchic a copy of Out of My Dreams, an album he had recorded with his band the Nightcrawlers. Out of My Dreams contained a song called "Cruisin' in the Park", which Mellencamp liked. This led to a phone call regarding Mellencamp's wanting to record "Cruisin' in the Park" as the first single from Uh-Huh. Cary recalled, "He ended up using the fourth verse from my song to start his song, 'Lovin Mother Fo Ya'." A writing-credit deal was signed and Cary got 15% royalties for that song.

In addition, Mellencamp turned a song his hairdresser, Dan Ross (also lead singer in a local Indiana band), had started into "Play Guitar". Mellencamp's guitar player, Larry Crane, added to the music of "Play Guitar", which has numerous musical similarities to Van Morrison's "Gloria".

Songs
Cash Box reviewed the single release of "Authority Song" saying "Opening with a twanging country riff, this rocker jumps off the vinyl with the authority that Cougar-Mellencamp is singing against: 'I fight authority, and authority always wins!'" Cash Box especially praised the "pounding rhythm section and percussion work."

Cash Box also said that "with a resounding bass line and lyrics that bite, 'Serious Business' is the kind of all-out rocking that Mellencamp makes his own as he renders some of the finest rock artistry around."

Track listing
All songs written by John Mellencamp; except where noted.

 "Crumblin' Down" (Mellencamp, George Green) – 3:33
 "Pink Houses" – 4:43
 "Authority Song" – 3:49
 "Warmer Place to Sleep" (Mellencamp, Green) – 3:48
 "Jackie O" (Mellencamp, John Prine) – 3:04
 "Play Guitar" (Larry Crane, Mellencamp, Dan Ross) – 3:25
 "Serious Business" – 3:25
 "Lovin' Mother fo Ya" (Will Cary, Mellencamp) – 3:06
 "Golden Gates" – 4:04
 "Pink Houses" (acoustic version, 2005 re-issue bonus track) – 3:45

Personnel
 John Mellencamp – vocals, guitar, tambourine
 Larry Crane – guitar
 Kenny Aronoff – drums, percussion
 Toby Myers – bass
 Mike Wanchic – guitar, background vocals
 Louis Johnson – bass
 Caroll Sue Hill – vocals
 Maggie Ryder – vocals
 Jay Ferguson – vocals

Charts

Weekly charts

References

1983 albums
Albums produced by Don Gehman
John Mellencamp albums
Riva Records albums